Maliattha blandula is a species of moth in the family Noctuidae first described by Achille Guenée in 1862. It is found in Tanzania, Madagascar, Mauritius, Réunion and the Comoros. It was placed in the genus Maliattha in 2016.

References 

Eustrotiinae
Moths described in 1862
Moths of Africa
Moths of Madagascar
Moths of Réunion
Taxa named by Achille Guenée